was a Japanese writer and film producer who is best known for co-writing the screenplays for several Akira Kurosawa films, including Throne of Blood, The Hidden Fortress, Yojimbo and High and Low.  He also produced several of Kurosawa's early 1960s films.  In addition to his work with Kurosawa, screenplays he wrote or co-wrote include Tora! Tora! Tora!, Hiroshi Inagaki's Arashi and The Birth of Japan, and Mikio Naruse's When a Woman Ascends the Stairs, on which he also served as producer.

In 2013, Kikushima and frequent screenwriting collaborators Kurosawa, Shinobu Hashimoto and Hideo Oguni were awarded the Jean Renoir Award by the Writers Guild of America West.

References

External links

Japanese film producers
1914 births
1989 deaths
People from Yamanashi Prefecture
Writers from Yamanashi Prefecture
20th-century Japanese screenwriters
20th-century Japanese people